Commiphora angolensis, also known as sand commiphora or sand corkwood, is a shrub species in the genus Commiphora growing mainly in Angola and Namibia.

The adults and larvae of Diamphidia nigroornata feed on C. angolensis.

The bark of C. angolensis contains condensed tannins and the anthocyanin petunidin-3-rhamnoglucoside.

See also 
 List of Southern African indigenous trees and woody lianes

References

External links 

 Flora of Zimbabwe
 Kew garden
 jstor
 Tree Atlas of Namibia
 Ville de Geneve - CJB - Base de données des plantes d'Afrique (French)

angolensis
Flora of South Tropical Africa
Flora of Southern Africa
Plants described in 1883